National Road 45 or State Highway 45 is a  highway of eastern Burma, passing through Shan State. It connects Nansang to Mong Ton and the Thai border in the southeast.

The highway is fed by the National Highway 4 at Nansang at  just west of Nansang Airport.

Roads in Myanmar
Shan State